Antsalaka or Antsalaka Atsimo is a town and commune in northern Madagascar. It belongs to the district of Antsiranana II, which is a part of Diana Region. The population of the commune was estimated to be approximately 4,000 in 2001 commune census.

Only primary schooling is available. The majority 99.8% of the population of the commune are farmers.  The most important crop is beans, while other important agricultural products are maize and rice.  Services provide employment for 0.2% of the population.

References and notes 

Populated places in Diana Region